The Golden Bell Awards is an annual Taiwanese television and radio production award presented in October or November each year by the Bureau of Audiovisual and Music Industry Development, a division of Taiwan's Ministry of Culture. It is the first radio and television production award in Chinese circulation, founded in 1965, and Taiwan's equivalent to the Emmy Awards. It is also one of the three major annual entertainment and cultural awards presented in Taiwan, along with the Golden Melody Awards for music and the Golden Horse Film Festival and Awards for films. The awards were presented by the Government Information Office until 2011.

Currently, there are two main streams presented at separate ceremonies: Television Golden Bell Awards and Broadcast Golden Bell Awards.

History
When they began the awards only focused on news programs, music shows and advertisements. After five years, however, television programs were also included. The first iterations of the Golden Bell Awards had awards for "Programs Targeting the Mainland."

Timeline

1965 - Established by Government Information Office
1968 - Handover to Council for Cultural Affairs
1975 - Council for Cultural Affairs was closed, Government Information Office takeover
1980 - International, professional and artistic is the aim set by Government Information Office to be achieved by inviting foreign television broadcasting experts to join.
1981 - Starting from this year the awards began to broadcast on television, with many changes made to attract more viewers.
1982 -  Two new awards were added, "Academic Theory" and "Videoing Technology".
1984 - Before the ceremony, there was a cocktail party for the nominees and its family members. This year the emphasis of the awards is that if you are one of the nominees, you are already a winner.
1993-1999 - The awards were split into two separate awards ceremonies, one for television broadcasting and one for Radio broadcasting, which were held in alternating years (i.e. TV in 1993, radio in 1994 and so on). From year 2000 onwards, both ceremonies are held every year.
1995-1999 - Republic of China Association of radio and television broadcasting, Television Society of the Republic of China, Foundation Development Fund and the host of radio and television broadcasting stations jointly co-organized the ceremony. This was the first time the general public could participate in the awards.
2000-2003 - Government Information Office hand over to the Broadcasting Development Foundation to coordinate. However, in 2004 the Government Information Office took back control of the award ceremony.
2007-2008 -  Government Information Office used the theme "Student Association" for the ceremony. The ceremony invited three different generations of television broadcasting personnel. 
2011 - The 46th Golden Bell Awards was the first time it was broadcast live in Full HD, and an app was released by the Government Information Office allowing it to be watched on a smart phone or tablet pc. This year theme was the convergence of mobile network, internet and television broadcast.
2022 - The 57th Golden Bell Awards was separated into two ceremonies, one for television shows, and the other for drama series. Four additional technical categories were also given out, namely Best Costume Design for a Drama Series, Best Visual Effects for a Drama Series, Best Score for a Drama Series and Best Theme Song. Popular voting awards were introduced as well at the 57th Golden Bell Awards, where viewers can vote online to decide the winners for the Most Popular Drama Series and Most Popular Variety Show.

Public's view
Some argued that nine people voting for the Golden Bell Awards is unfair and biased as they believe that it is a subjective choice made by the judges. Some judges were also questioned by the general public for not being professionals of the television industry.

Award categories

Television Broadcasting Golden Bell Awards

Drama Series categories

Program Awards
 Best Television Series
 Best Miniseries
 Best Television Film

Individual Awards
 Best Directing for a Television Series
 Best Writing for a Television Series
 Best Leading Actor in a Television Series
 Best Leading Actress in a Television Series
 Best Supporting Actor in a Television Series
 Best Supporting Actress in a Television Series
 Best Newcomer in a Television Series
 Best Directing for a Miniseries or Television Film
 Best Writing for a Miniseries or Television Film
 Best Leading Actor in a Miniseries or Television Film
 Best Leading Actress in a Miniseries or Television Film
 Best Supporting Actor in a Miniseries or Television Film
 Best Supporting Actress in a Miniseries or Television Film
 Best Newcomer in a Miniseries or Television Film

Technical Awards
 Best Cinematography for a Drama Series
 Best Editing for a Drama Series
 Best Lighting for a Drama Series
 Best Sound Design for a Drama Series
 Best Art and Design for a Drama Series
 Best Costume Design for a Drama Series
 Best Visual Effects for a Drama Series
 Best Score for a Drama Series
 Best Theme Song

Other Awards
 Special Contribution Award
 Creative Award for a Drama Series
 Most Popular Drama Series

Television Show categories

Program Awards
 Best Variety Show
 Best Reality or Game Show
 Best Lifestyle Show
 Best Natural Science Documentary Show (自然科學紀實節目獎)
 Best Humanities Documentary Show (人文紀實節目)
 Best Children Show (兒童節目獎)
 Best Youth Show (少年節目獎)
 Best Animated Show (動畫節目獎)

Individual Awards
 Best Host in a Variety Show
 Best Host in a Reality or Game Show
 Best Host in a Lifestyle Show
 Best Host in a Natural Science and Humanities Documentary Show (自然科學及人文紀實節目主持人獎)
 Best Host in a Children and Youth Show (兒童少年節目主持人獎)

Technical Awards
 Best Directing for a Television Show (一般節目類導演獎)
 Best Television Director (一般節目類導播獎)
 Best Cinematography for a Television Show (一般節目類攝影獎)
 Best Editing for a Television Show (一般節目類剪輯獎)
 Best Sound Design for a Television Show (一般節目類聲音設計獎)
 Best Lighting for a Television Show (一般節目類燈光獎)
 Best Art and Design for a Television Show (一般節目類美術設計獎)

Other Awards
 Special Contribution Award
 Creative Award for a Television Show
 Most Popular Variety Show

Radio Broadcasting Golden Bell Awards

Program Awards
 Popular Music Radio Program Award
 Genre Music Programming Award（類型音樂節目獎）
 Best Educational and Cultural Program (教育文化節目獎)
 Best Children Program (兒童少年節目獎)
 Best Comprehensive Program (綜合節目獎)
 Social Care Program Award
 Art and Culture Program Award
 Radio Drama Award
 Youth Program Award
 Community Program Award

Advertising Awards
 Best Selling Advertising Award
 Best Advertising Award
 Best Marketing Program (節目行銷獎)
 Best Advertising Campaign (頻道廣告獎)
 Research and Development Award
 Radio Marketing Innovation Award

Individual Awards
 DJ Award
 Genre Music Programming Presenters Award（類型音樂節目主持人獎）
 Education and Culture Presenters Award
 Children Show Host Award
 Social Care Award Host
 Art and Culture Award Host
 Comprehensive Award Host
 Community Award Host
 Planning and Preparation Award
 Sound Award

Ceremonies

Further reading
 "Golden Bell Awards". Taiwan Image. Retrieved 2013-08-07.
 2004: PTS dominates again at Golden Bell Awards. Taipei Times. Retrieved 2013-08-07.
 2005:  40th Golden Bell Awards homepage. Sina. Retrieved 2013-08-07.
 2006:  41st TV Golden Bell Awards homepage - 2006. Azio TV. Retrieved 2013-08-07.
 2007:  42nd Golden Bell Awards. Sohu.com. Retrieved 2013-08-07.
 2008:  43rd Golden Bell Awards. Sohu.com. Retrieved 2013-08-07.
 2009:  44th Golden Bell Awards. Sohu.com. Retrieved 2013-08-07.
 2010: Updated with brief recap: Winners at the 45th Golden Bell Awards (2010). CPopAccess. Retrieved 2013-08-07.
 2011: Winners of the 46th annual Golden Bell Awards (2011). CPopAccess. Retrieved 2013-08-07.
 2012: "WINNERS OF THE 2012 GOLDEN BELL AWARDS". MOC.gov. Retrieved 2013-08-07.

See also
 List of Asian television awards

References

Notes

External links
 
 

 
Annual television shows
Awards established in 1965
1965 establishments in Taiwan